Bishopbriggs South is one of the seven wards used to elect members of the East Dunbartonshire Council. Created in 2007, it elects three Councillors. As its name suggests, its territory consists of the southern part of the burgh of Bishopbriggs (including Auchinairn), bordering the city of Glasgow further south; following a 2017 boundary review, some streets in the west of the town (between the Croy Line railway tracks and the Bishopbriggs Burn) were added from the Bishopbriggs North and Torrance ward, but the number of representatives did not change. In 2020, the ward had a population of 15,868.

Councillors

Election results

2022 election
2022 East Dunbartonshire Council election

2017 election
2017 East Dunbartonshire Council election

2012 election
2012 East Dunbartonshire Council election

2009 by-election

2007 election
2007 East Dunbartonshire Council election

References

Wards of East Dunbartonshire
Bishopbriggs